The 1955–56 European Cup was the first season of the European Cup, UEFA's premier club football tournament. The tournament was won by Real Madrid, who defeated Stade de Reims 4–3 in the final at Parc des Princes, Paris, on 13 June 1956.

The participating clubs in the first five seasons of the European Cup were selected by French football magazine L'Equipe on the basis that they were representative and prestigious clubs in Europe. When the tournament started, Real Madrid, Anderlecht, Milan, Rot-Weiss Essen, Stade de Reims, Djurgården and AGF Aarhus were the reigning champions of their respective national leagues. English champions Chelsea initially agreed to compete and were drawn against Swedish side Djurgården; however, under pressure from the Football League, who saw the tournament as a distraction to domestic football, they later withdrew from the competition, and were replaced by Gwardia Warszawa of Poland. Scottish champions Aberdeen withdrew under similar circumstances. In addition, Holland Sport, Honvéd and AB rejected the opportunity to represent the Netherlands, Hungary and Denmark respectively, being replaced by PSV Eindhoven, Vörös Lobogó and AGF Aarhus (PSV and Vörös Lobogó becoming the last teams until 1997–98 to qualify for the European Cup not by either winning a domestic league or being current title holders). This was also the only UEFA tournament to include a representative of Saarland, unified into West Germany in 1957.

The first round pairings were fixed by the organisers and not drawn as would be the case for all future European Cup matches.

Teams

Bracket

First round

First leg

Second leg

Real Madrid won 7–0 on aggregate.

Partizan won 8–5 on aggregate.

Hibernian won 5–1 on aggregate.

Djurgården won 4–1 on aggregate.

Vörös Lobogó won 10–4 on aggregate.

Reims won 4–2 on aggregate.

Rapid Wien won 6–2 on aggregate.

Milan won 7–5 on aggregate.

Quarter-finals

First leg

Note – differences in information: RSSSF website indicates that the goal scored on 26 minute was scored by Robert Körner, while UEFA website indicates that it was scored by Alfred Körner

Second leg

Hibernian won 4–1 on aggregate.

Reims won 8–6 on aggregate.

Real Madrid won 4–3 on aggregate.

Milan won 8–3 on aggregate.

Semi-finals

First leg

Second leg

Reims won 3–0 on aggregate.

Real Madrid won 5–4 on aggregate.

Final

Top goalscorers

Notes

External links

1955–56 season at UEFA website
1955–56 All matches – season at UEFA website
 All scorers 1955–56 European Cup according to protocols UEFA
European Cup results at Rec.Sport.Soccer Statistics Foundation
 
 1955-56 European Cup – results and line-ups (archive)

1955–56 in European football
European Champion Clubs' Cup seasons